Quercianella is a frazione of the comune of Livorno, in the province of Livorno, Tuscany, Italy. It represents the extreme south of Livorno, and is separated from the city by a stretch of rocky coastline denominated "Il Romito." The frazione is located a few kilometers north of Castiglioncello.

Photo gallery

External links
 Quercianella pro loco, tourist information

References
All demographics and other statistics: Italian statistical institute Istat.

Frazioni of Livorno